Battleship is an elongated ice-free massif  long between Rotunda Glacier and Blankenship Glacier, southern tributaries to Ferrar Glacier in the Royal Society Range in Antarctica. It was descriptively named by New Zealand Geographic Board (NZGB) in 1994. The shape of the massif resembles the superstructure and forward part of a battleship.

Mountain ranges of Victoria Land